This is a list of the land border crossings of Afghanistan with its six neighbors, namely Pakistan, Iran, Turkmenistan, Uzbekistan, Tajikistan and China.

Pakistan

There are at least six official Afghan border control points next to the border between Afghanistan and Pakistan.

Iran

There are at least three official Afghan border control points next to the border between Afghanistan and Iran.

Turkmenistan

There are two Afghan border control points next to the border between Afghanistan and Turkmenistan.

Uzbekistan

There is one Afghan border control point next to the border between Afghanistan and Uzbekistan.

Tajikistan

There are at least five Afghan border control points next to the border between Afghanistan and Tajikistan.

China

An official border crossing between Afghanistan and China is being considered at the Wakhjir Pass in the Wakhan District of Badakhshan Province.

See also 
Economy of Afghanistan
List of airports in Afghanistan
Tourism in Afghanistan
Transport in Afghanistan

References 

border
Border crossings of Afghanistan